Web Junkie is a 2013 American-Israeli documentary film co-written, directed and produced by Hilla Medalia and Shosh Shlam. The film premiered at the 2013 Jerusalem Film Festival on July 10, 2013.

The film also premiered in-competition in the World Cinema Documentary Competition at 2014 Sundance Film Festival on January 19, 2014.

After its premiere at the Sundance Film Festival, Dogwoof Pictures acquired the worldwide distribution rights of the film. The film will be broadcast in the UK at BBC Storyville, who has acquired the British TV rights of the film.

Synopsis
The film focuses on the Chinese government's classification of internet addiction as a clinical disorder and focuses on the treatment used in Chinese rehabilitation centres.

Reception
Web Junkie received mostly positive reviews upon its premiere at the 2014 Sundance Film Festival. Review aggregator Rotten Tomatoes gives the film a 67% rating based on reviews from 6 critics, with an average score of 6.1/10.

Dennis Harvey of Variety, wrote in his review that "A bizarre and entertaining documentary about China's attempts to reprogram its Internet-addicted youth." Duane Byrge in his review for The Hollywood Reporter called the film "A startling look at China’s Internet addiction centers." Drew Taylor from Indiewire praised the film by writing that "The specificity of the documentary...is one of its biggest strengths since it is able to place you right alongside these kids...But it also has the effect of being even more heartbreaking." Dan Fienberg of HitFix gave the film grade B and wrote that "Web Junkie is a little sad, a little funny and a little scary. I'd say that I wish it had been a little more provocative, but I'm sure conversations after screenings will serve some of that purpose and those are conversations worth having." In her review for The Telegraph, Amber Wilkinson praised the directors of the film that "Directors Shosh Shlam and Hilla Medalia get a remarkable amount of access to one of 400 rehabilitation camps set up in China." However Dan Schindel of Movie Mezzanine criticized the film, writing that "What really undoes the film is its formlessness."

Accolades

See also 
List of TV and films with critiques of Chinese Communist Party

References

External links
 Official website
 
 

2013 films
2013 documentary films
American documentary films
Israeli documentary films
Documentary films about the Internet
Documentary films about China
Internet in China
2010s English-language films
2010s American films